Bamboo weaving is a type of bambooworking in which two distinct sets of bamboo strips are interlaced at normally right angles to form an object. The longitudinal lengths of bamboo are called the warp and the lateral lengths are known as the weft (also known as 'woof', an archaic English word meaning "that which is woven"), or filling. The method in which these strips are woven affects the characteristics of the finished piece.

Bamboo is typically hand-woven, with a number of bamboo weaving traditions having developed globally over time, particularly in Southeast Asia and East Asia, where bamboo suitable for weaving is particularly abundant.

Types
 Chinese bamboo weaving
 Japanese bamboo weaving
 Korean 
 Taiwanese bamboo weaving
 Jaapi (Assam, India)
 Olia (Odisha, India; grain storage basket)

See also 
 , a Korean style of sedge weaving

Notes

References

Bamboo weaving